Little Mill or Lille Mølle may refer to:

Places
Little Mill, Monmouthshire, Wales
Littlemill, Nairnshire, Scotland

Windmills

Denmark
Lille Mølle, Christianshavn 
Lille Mølle, Lille Skensted, a windmill in Denmark

United Kingdom
Little Mill, Cross in Hand, a windmill in East Sussex
Little Mill, Thorpe le Soken, a windmill in Essex
Little Mill, Bethersden, a windmill in Kent
Little Mill, Frindsbury, a windmill in Kent
Little Mill, Sheerness, a windmill in Kent

Other uses
Littlemill (whisky distillery), a whisky distillery in Scotland
Little Mill railway station, a closed railway station Berwickshire, Scotland
Little Mill, East Peckham, a watermill on the River Bourne, Kent